A double-decker bus or double-deck bus is a bus that has two storeys or decks. They are used for mass transport in the United Kingdom, the United States, New Zealand, Europe, Asia and also in cities such as Sydney; the best-known example is the red London bus, namely the AEC Routemaster.

Early double-deckers put the driver in a separate cab. Passenger access was via an open platform at the rear and a bus conductor collected fares. Modern double-deckers have a main entrance door at the front and the driver takes fares, thus halving the number of workers aboard, but slowing the boarding process. The rear open platform, popular with passengers, was abandoned for safety reasons, as there was a risk of passengers falling when running and jumping onto the bus.

Double-deckers are primarily for commuter transport, but open-top models are used as sight-seeing buses for tourists. William Gladstone, speaking of London's double-deck horse-drawn omnibuses, once observed that "...the best way to see London is from the top of a bus".

By country
Cities listed here have double-decker buses as part of their regular mass transit fleet. Cities with only tourist and sightseeing double-decker buses are excluded.

Europe

In the European Union, the maximum height for any vehicle is 4 metres, for motor vehicles in categories M2 and M3 and their trailers in category 0 and motor vehicles in categories N2 and N3 and their trailers in categories 03 and 04, in national and international traffic according to Council directive 96/53/EC of 25 July 1996 and in continuity of council directive 85/3/CEE.

The United Kingdom has a triple standard for the double-decker bus: highbridge bus (urban Britain), lowbridge bus (countryside Britain) and 4 metres height coach such as the Neoplan Skyliner that can traverse Europe.

United Kingdom

The first commercial horse-drawn double-decker omnibuses were introduced in England in 1847 by Adams & Co. of Fairfield, Bow; it was then improved upon by John Greenwood, who introduced a new double-decker in 1852.

Double-decker buses are in common use throughout the United Kingdom and have been favoured over articulated buses by many operators because of the shorter length of double-deckers and larger seating capacity; they also may be safer to operate through narrow streets and round tight corners.

However, the total maximum dimensions, including trailer or articulated section, in normal circumstances are:

In 1941, Miss Phyllis Thompson became the first woman licensed to drive a double-decker vehicle in the United Kingdom. She drove for the bus company Felix Bus Services, then at Hatfield near Doncaster.

The red double-decker buses in London have become a national symbol of England. Most buses in London, as in the rest of the UK, are double-deckers. A particular example was the AEC Routemaster bus, which had been a staple of the public transport network in London for nearly half a century following its introduction in 1956. The remaining Routemasters in use were finally retired from general service in 2005 because of cited difficulties accommodating disabled passengers. Transport for London kept these vintage buses in operation on heritage route 15H until 2020, when it was discontinued due to the COVID-19 pandemic. The contract expired in November 2020 and was not renewed; in 2021 it was announced that the service would no longer continue. There was formerly a second heritage route (9H) but this ceased operation in 2014 due to low patronage and increased operation costs.

In 2007, a hybrid-powered double-decker entered service on London Buses route 141. By late 2008, more hybrid double-deckers from three manufacturers entered service in London. A New Routemaster was developed that year and entered service on 20 February 2012. In October 2015, London added five all-electric double-decker buses - the world's first - made by Chinese firm BYD.

Isle of Man
Bus Vannin operates several double-deckers on routes all across the island.

Republic of Ireland

In the Republic of Ireland, nearly all of the buses operated in and around Greater Dublin by Dublin Bus are double-deckers. There are 1,000 double-decker buses (second after London) in the company's fleet of 1,008 (October 2019). The private operator Go-Ahead Ireland also operate a mixed fleet consisting of both double and single deck vehicles.

Bus Éireann also utilises double-decker buses on some of its commuter routes, such as the Dublin to Wicklow service. Double-deckers are also common on some of the company's city routes in Cork, Galway and Limerick. More luxurious double-deckers are used on inter-city routes, such as the X1 Dublin-Belfast or X3/X4 Dublin-Derry routes.

Austria
Double decker buses were in use on city services in Vienna between 1960 and 1991. They are used on services between Vienna and its airport, and also operated by Ötztaler Verkehrsgesellschaft (ÖVG) under contract to ÖBB-Postbus on service 4420 between Innsbruck and Lienz.

Czech Republic
Since 2020, two Scania UNVI Urbis DD CNG cars have been running on public transport lines in Ostrava. During working days on line 78. Over the weekend and holidays during the summer season on line 88.

Denmark
Since 1970, various operators of Copenhagen city transport were using double-deckers—originally Leyland, in the 1980s–1990s MAN and in the 2000s Volvo, derivates of model B7.

Finland

Double-decker buses are relatively rare in Finland, but there are known to be at least four Routemasters in Finland: one in Helsinki, one in Heinola, one in summer tourist charter in Espoo and one in summer tourist traffic in Kuopio. In the autumn of 2019, Public Transport of Turku, also known as Föli, was the first city to officially incorporate double-decker buses into local traffic.

France

The first French double-decker bus was brought into service in Paris in 1853; it was a horse-drawn omnibus. The upper floor was cheaper and often uncovered.

The first double-decker motor bus in Paris, the Schneider Brillié P2, appeared in 1906. It was designed to carry more passengers and to replace the horse-drawn double-decker omnibus. Like trams and omnibuses, double-decker motor buses included two classes of travel: first class inside the car and second class outdoors on top. But this type of vehicle was withdrawn in 1911 because one of them overturned at place de l'Étoile; following this incident the P2s lost their upper deck and were renamed P3s.

It was not until 1966 that the RATP re-tried double-deckers on two lines in Paris. A prototype built by Berliet (type E-PCMR), was put into service in 1966, with an order being placed for 25 vehicles. The first production car was commissioned on 19 June 1968 for line 94, Gare Montparnasse - Levallois. On 17 February 1969, line 53, Opera - Porte d'Asnieres was in turn equipped with this model. But traffic problems caused RATP to definitively abandon this vehicle in 1977, because this type of bus was found to be poorly suited to the structure of the Paris network, the stops being too close to each other, preventing people from going upstairs. Consequently, there are no Parisian bus routes using double-deckers.

SITAC operates a service 5 between Calais and Sangatte using a double decker bus.

Germany

In Germany, double-decker buses in Berlin are operated by Berliner Verkehrsbetriebe (BVG). The fleet was reduced from 1,000 in 1992 to 450 in 2002. The replacements, which are supplied by Neoman Bus, are  longer. The new buses are able to hold 128 passengers.

Italy
During the 1960s and 1970s, major cities like Turin, Milan, Rome, Florence, Verona, Bologna, Rimini, Naples, Bari and Palermo adopted Fiat double decker buses.

The most common model was the Fiat 412 Aerfer, and in 1961 it was replaced by Fiat 413 Viberti Monotral CV61.

Liechtenstein
Liemobil operates four double decker MAN A39 buses on service 11 between Sargans, Switzerland and Feldkirch, Vorarlberg, Austria and on other services 12, 13 and 14 in the country.

Netherlands
It is only very recently that double-decker buses have started to be used in the Netherlands. On 10 December 2017 Connexxion put 18 three-axle double-deckers into service on route 346 between Haarlem and Amsterdam Zuid, a heavily used commuter route not served by rail. Their introduction was not entirely without issues since their route initially had to be diverted to avoid passing under a dangerously low tram overhead wire near the VU Medical Centre stop.

Also in December 2017, Qbuzz introduced five double-deckers on its route 300 between Groningen and Emmen.

North Macedonia

The Macedonian government bought 217 Yutong City Master double-decker city buses for local transport in Skopje, the capital. The first shipment of 68 custom-made buses arrived in Skopje in 2011 from China's Zhengzhou Yutong factory. The buses were put into operation on 8 September 2011, coinciding with the day of Macedonian independence. This model of bus has capacity for 80 passengers.

Norway
In June 2008 Boreal Transport on contract with Kolumbus introduced three double-decker buses to provide more seating for certain high-traffic departures in Stavanger.

Poland
PKS Szczecin since 2021.

Portugal

Double-decker buses were introduced in Portugal during the 1950s when buses in general started to be used in the main cities such as Lisbon, Porto, Coimbra and Setúbal. The types used were the AEC Regent and later the Daimler Fleetline and the Leyland Atlantean, with Portuguese-built bodies. There was also one Leyland Olympian as a demonstration vehicle in Lisbon. In Porto, there were double-decker trolleybuses, produced by Lancia and with Dalfa bodywork, in use from the mid-1960s until the mid-1990s. Double-decker buses were not in widespread use for normal service but were mainly used for sightseeing purposes. 
They were most commonly Portuguese-produced vehicles, including rebodies of regular service buses (for example, the Volvo B10R from Carristur), as well as some from former companies, such as the MAN SD202 from BVG Berlin, many of them still in circulation.
The absence of double-decker buses on regular service lasted until 2011, when STCP acquired 15 double-decker buses, of the type MAN A39 (as used in Berlin). They were introduced at an event by the company, named "Duplex Tour", on 26 February 2011 and put into normal service on the 28th of that month. These buses can be seen usually on route 500.

Russia

Until 2011 double-decker buses were operating in the city of Barnaul. The double-decker fleet consisted of seven MAN SD200 and MAN SD202 second hand buses imported from Berlin. Those buses were used on routes 3, 10 and 17.

In the mid-1990s, some double-deckers were operated briefly in Saint Petersburg.

Spain

Double-decker buses were introduced in 2014 in Bilbao by the city bus operator Bilbobus. They are not the first double deck vehicles in the city as ex-London Transport Q1 trolleybuses were sold to Bilbao after the end of London trolleybus operations in 1962 and were operated until the system's closure in 1978. Initially, six vehicles are operating on Bilbobus route 56. They have a capacity of 132 passengers - 80 seated and fifty standing.

Sweden

Sweden bought in 1965 50 Leyland Atlantean double-decker buses with Park Royal bodies. Leyland claimed they were the first double-decker buses with one man operation. They had two staircases and two pairs of doors. The Atlanteans were not replaced at the end of their revenue service life in 1974. Recently, however, in 2011 double-deckers returned to Sweden on revenue duties with VDL Synergy on in the SL 676 Stockholm Östra - Norrtälje line. Norrtälje is located around 70 km north of Stockholm.

Switzerland
In Switzerland Postauto operate double decker buses on a route between Engelburg–St Gallen–Heiden routes and in the Obertoggenburg region and in the regions of Rorschach and Goldach. 19 Alexander Dennis Enviro500 have been ordered to operate on these services, which seat 80 passengers and can carry 48 standing. Four double deckers are also operated in Graubünden which are due to be replaced within the next two years.

Turkey
In Turkey, the Istanbul public transit system (IETT) runs 89 double-decker buses on longer-distance routes, most notably commuter buses crossing the Bosphorus Bridge linking the European and the Asiatic sides of the city. Double-decker buses are also used on routes to and from Taksim Square to far-flung western suburbs such as Büyükçekmece and Bahcesehir.

Africa

Egypt

Several cities in Egypt use double-decker buses as part of their public transportation systems, including Cairo.  The MAN Lion's City buses, manufactured in Egypt in 2018, were introduced in Cairo to address provide greater capacity on its bus network . Red double-decker buses are also a feature of Alexandria's bus network.

Ethiopia
In 2017, as part of a larger order of 850 new buses, the city of Addis Ababa purchased a fleet of 50 double-decker buses to operate routes on its public transportation system. Of these, 25 are operated by the Anbessa City Bus Service Enterprise and 25 are part of the Sheger bus company's fleet; both are government-owned.

Kenya

A fleet of double-decker buses operate in Mombasa, running a route aimed at tourists. The buses are open top, and run on a hop-on hop-off sightseeing route around the city; they are manufactured by Yaxing Coach. Since 2014, a double-decker bus owned by the City Shuttle Bus Company also provides public transportation in Nairobi.

Malawi
In Malawi, multiple companies utilize fleets of double-decker buses for intercity bus services. Modern Marcopolo buses run direct routes between the nation's two largest cities, Lilongwe and Blantyre. New double-decker buses are also in use on more regional routes, including those connecting cities like Mangochi, Mzimba, and Mzuzu.

South Africa
Double-decker buses are a feature of a number of transportation systems in South Africa. Johannesburg's public bus system, known as Metrobus and operated by the city, has 550 buses that run on 84 routes throughout the city. Of these, 150 are modern double-decker buses manufactured by Volvo, Scania, and Marcopolo. The City of Tshwane Metropolitan Municipality in Gauteng Province boasts 113 double-decker busses among its public transportation fleet. Golden Arrow Bus Services, the main operator of bus services in Cape Town, is the owner of recently acquired double-decker MAN Lion's City buses. Like in other countries across Southern Africa, double-decker buses are often utilized by private companies for intercity transport connecting major population centers, as well as linking South African cities with hubs in Botswana, Malawi, Mozambique, Namibia, and Zimbabwe. A number of tourism companies offer open top, double-decker bus sightseeing tours of major cities in South Africa.

Zambia
Double-decker buses are used by a number of private companies in Zambia for intercity bus services, both domestically connecting Lusaka and other cities across the country and internationally to cities like Johannesburg.

East Asia

Mainland China

Several cities in continental China have double-deckers in regular use on certain crowded lines, while some have a few double-deck buses in use on lines which also use single-deck vehicles, e.g. Nanning on line  704 in peak hours. Guilin is leading city that operate double-deckers regularly in major routes; in its main street the double-deckers prevails and run one-by-one almost every minute. Besides Guilin and Nanning, Beijing, Shanghai, Guangzhou, Shenzhen, Tianjin, Hangzhou, Wuhan, Dalian, Foshan and Kunming also have those buses in service, particularly on routes during rush hours. Larger towns in the developed coastal provinces, including Shaoxing, Zhejiang province, use double-decker buses.

Hong Kong

The former British colony of Hong Kong introduced its first double-decker buses in 1949 by Kowloon Motor Bus. They have become very popular since then, and they are found in large numbers among the fleets of the territory's major bus operators (see below). Today, the majority of buses running in Hong Kong are double-decker buses, and all of them are air-conditioned. Also, Hong Kong has a double-deck trams system, one of three only in the world as of 2015 and the only fleet which is all double-deck.

Macau
In the former Portuguese territory of Macau, Fok Lei and its successor Transmac used second-hand double-deckers
widely from the early 1970s until the late 1980s.

Taiwan
In early 1990s two tri-axle Leyland Olympians were evaluated in Taipei and Taichung. The evaluation was unsuccessful and the buses were sold to Hong Kong for spares.

Japan

By Japanese law, vehicles are confined to maximum  height and  length. Japanese double-decker buses are mainly used for inter-city highway buses (i.e., motor coaches), city tours, and charter buses. In 1960, Kinki Sharyo and Hino Motors manufactured the first original double-decker bus "Vista Coach" for Kinki Nippon Railway (Kintetsu).

In 1979, Chuo Kotsu, a chartered bus operator in Osaka, imported the Neoplan Skyliner. Skyliner, and the other imported buses: Van Hool Astromega TD824, Drögmöller E440 Meteor, and a few MAN coaches inspired Japanese bus manufactures, who developed three domestic models in the mid-1980s: "Nissan Diesel Space Dream", "Hino Grand View" and "Mitsubishi Fuso Aero King". Nevertheless, Aero King was sold for 22 years, but, being unable to meet exhaust gas emission and safety levels, production stopped in 2005.

In 1982, Toei Bus operated Neoplan Skyliners in Tokyo, between Asakusa and Ueno to 2001. Joban Kotsu operated Skyliners in a trans-Fukushima route: between Iwaki and Aizu-Wakamatsu via Koriyama from 1983 to 1996.

Since the 1990s, JR Buses started to use Aero King for an overnight inter-city highway bus service named "Dream-go". The first Aero King in Dream-go, operated to "Fuku Fuku Tokyo" between Tokyo and Shimonoseki, Yamaguchi with Sanden Kotsu, which was replaced with a "super high-decker" coach in middle of the 1990s, "Fuku Fuku Tokyo," and finally stopped in 2006.

Japanese overnight highway buses are mainly equipped with a three-line, two-aisle (1+1+1) seat configuration with reclining seats. When this configuration is used on an ordinary coach, it has 28, 29 or 31 seats. When this configuration is used on a double-decker bus, it has 36 or 40 seats: the vehicle's price and capacity increase while operating cost decreases.

JR Bus group mainly uses Aero King, Skyliner, and a few Jonckheere Monaco (equipped with Nissan Diesel engine) for inter-city highway bus operations between Kanto (near Tokyo) and Kansai (near Osaka), which is named "Dream-go" (overnight express) and "Hiru-tokkyu" (Daytime Express). The other bus operators, inspired by "Dream-go", increased use of the Aero King for overnight inter-city bus service.

JR Bus Kanto imported four Neoplan Megaliner N128/4, leasing two to an operating partner (from 2003 to 2006, Kanto Railway, since 2006 Nishinihon JR Bus). The Megaliner has also been converted for a low-price overnight highway bus service between Tokyo and Osaka called "Seishun Mega Dream-go," with special authorisation.

South Korea
In 2015, a fleet of 20 double-decker buses was introduced for commuters making the journey between the capital Seoul and its surrounding Gyeonggi Province and nearby Incheon city in 2015 as a pilot project.

North Korea
Double deckers started running on Pyongyang streets in the latter half of 2000s.

South Asia

Bangladesh

The Bangladesh Road Transport Corporation operates a fleet of Ashok Leyland buses on the streets of Dhaka and Chittagong. Earlier, some Volvo B10M/Alexander buses also used to run in Dhaka, but most of those have been withdrawn from service recently.

India

In India, cities such as Hyderabad, Bangalore, Delhi, and Kolkata had double deckers for a while before discontinuing them. Chennai's Metropolitan Transport Corporation (MTC) had a small fleet of double-decker buses, mostly in the high-density, longer distance routes. They operated from 1975 before being wound up. They were briefly reintroduced in 1997 and were operated till 2008. Mumbai has operated double-decker buses since 1937. They are operated by the Brihanmumbai Electric Supply and Transport undertaking.

Kerala State Road Transport Corporation is operating double deckers in Thiruvananthapuram and Kochi cities. They are modelled on the London buses. Ashok Leyland Titan double decker buses are used in all cities. Articulated double-decker buses from Ashok Leyland were used till they were phased out in the early 1990s as they were thought to be unsuitable for city traffic.

In 2020 CSTC reintroduced double decker buses on selected routes of Kolkata where wide road space was available, i.e. no over-head cables, low bridges or flyovers. CSTC reportedly has spent 1 million INR to renovate 1 bus.

Sri Lanka

In the 1950s, double-decker buses of the South Western Bus Company plied on the Galle Road in Colombo, Sri Lanka. These were taken over by the Ceylon Transport Board (CTB) when all bus services were nationalised in 1958. Beginning around 1959, large numbers of second-hand double-decker buses of the RT, RTL and RTW classes were imported by the CTB from London Transport, and ran in their original red livery with the oval CTB logo painted on the sides. These buses were phased out beginning in the mid-1970s, and none remain in service. Later, around 1985, 40 ex-London Routemaster entered service. One Routemaster bus is run by the Sirasa TV and radio station.

Today's buses in Sri Lanka include AEC Routemaster (Currently phased out in order to make way for Volvo B9TL/East Lancs Nordic and incoming First Western Dennis Trident 2/Plaxton President - 2001/02), MCW Metrobus (including 12m parts), Leyland Atlantean, and Dennis Trident 2 (1999/2000), plus some of the Volvo B7TL/East Lancs Vyking and Volvo B9TL/East Lancs Nordic buses.

Southeast Asia

Indonesia

Indonesia first operated its double-decker bus fleet in 1968, with Leyland Titan double-decker bus first operated in Jakarta. The double-decker bus service linked Salemba in Central Jakarta with Blok M area in South Jakarta from 1968 to 1982. Between 1984 and 1996, the Jakarta municipal bus service, Perusahaan Umum Pengangkutan Penumpang Djakarta (Perum PPD) operated a fleet of 180 Volvo B55 double-decker buses, connecting various corners in the city.

The double-decker bus service ceased to operate in 1996 due to aging fleet, lack of spare parts, and there are no plan to renew the double-decker fleet in Jakarta. By that time, the remnant of double-decker bus body were sold and repurposed as bus-themed clothing store in Blok M and restaurant in Senayan (now SCBD) area, but now the establishment has been demolished.

By the early 2000s, the PPD has shifted their bus fleet from European built double-decker buses to cheaper second-hand Japanese buses and imported articulated buses from China. By that time, the double-decker seems to be lost in favour of articulated bus, which provides more exit and entry points to accommodate faster embarkment. By 2004 the TransJakarta bus rapid transit began its service in Jakarta, but uses no double-decker bus and chosen conventional and articulated buses instead.

Since February 2014, the Jakarta Government provides free double-decker bus tours that offers sightseeing in Central Jakarta. The buses' route covers tourist attractions, such as Monas, Istiqlal Mosque, the Cathedral, National Museum, Sarinah, and Plaza Indonesia, as well as Grand Indonesia shopping centres. As 2016 there are 18 double-decker buses in Jakarta, and the service is expanded to include Kota Tua and Gelora Bung Karno Stadium in Senayan area via Sudirman avenue.

Other than the capital Jakarta, there are some cities in Indonesia that have operated double-decker buses, mostly as city sightseeing tour service. They are Bandung, Semarang and Surakarta. The Bandros is a double-decker tourist bus operating in Bandung since 2014.

After the completion of Trans-Java highway section connecting Jakarta and Surabaya in 2018, some intercity bus services began operating fleet of double decker busses. This choice was due to a larger capacity and the available seat space for a more comfortable journey across Java. Previously, the problem on operating intercity double decker bus was the steep and narrow roads of mountainous interior on Java island. The Trans-Java highway enables a rather straight an even road terrain for smooth travel between major cities in Java.

Malaysia

Malaysia has historically seen the use of double-decker buses in mass transit to varying degrees, but were significantly limited in use due operational costs and driving spaces needed for such buses. Early double-decker municipal buses primarily existed in Malaya within the Kuala Lumpur area of Selangor and George Town, Penang between the late 1940s and the early 1960s, when double-deckers were eventually withdrawn in favour of cheaper and more agile single-deck buses.

The earliest recorded use of double-deckers by Malayan bus companies was in Selangor in 1948 when the Toong Fong Omnibus Company acquired two Park Royal-built Guy Arab IIIs at a cost of M$40,000 each; the General Transport Company (GTC) followed by acquiring Park Royal-built AEC Regent IIIs. While the buses saw service for over a decade, all of them were taken out of service for a variety of reasons and were never replaced with new double-deckers; the buses were often obstructed by narrow streets, trees, low bridges, and increasing overhead wires, while passengers eventually favoured staying on the lower deck of the bus; the cost of operating the buses was also higher due to a local vehicle tax calculated based on the number of seats of a taxed vehicle. One Toong Fong double-decker was burned in the late-1950s by communist insurgents, while the remaining double-deckers were ultimately disused by the mid-1960s due to age. The successor of the GTC, Sri Jaya, experimented with a reintroduction of double-deckers in 1989 by leasing a Singapore-assembled, 102-seat Leyland Olympian for use within Kuala Lumpur for 6 months, but found that street conditions were problematic as before and discontinued the use of the bus after the trial.

In George Town, Penang, five retired AEC C1-class double-decker trolleybuses were procured in 1956 by the George Town Municipal Tramways from London Transport as an experiment for the possible use of double-decker buses in George Town. Poor performance results and the advancing ages of the buses, coupled with efforts to replace the entire trolleybus fleet with single-deck diesel-powered buses in the 1960s, led to the withdrawal of the only double-deck buses in early Penangite public transport.

Following increasing public bus ridership, more open roadways and the feasibility of operating double-deck Hop-On Hop-Off tourist buses within Kuala Lumpur, Prasarana Malaysia purchased 40 (revised from an earlier 111) Alexander Dennis Enviro500 double-decker buses in 2014 to serve high volume Rapid KL Rapid Bus routes; with a capacity of 108 passengers each, it is double that of a contemporary single-deck bus in the fleet. The first five buses of the batch entered service in September 2015; with the rest of the fleet gradually added into service in the following months. In November 2019, Prasarana ordered a further 90 Gemilang Coachworks-bodied Volvo B8Ls as part of Rapid KL's bus fleet replacement programme, with the first batch of buses entering service in June 2020. Feasibility studies were also conducted by Prasarana in 2015 on the reintroduction of double-deckers in Penang through Rapid Penang's bus service. By August 2016, a fleet of three Rapid Penang Enviro500s were officially launched into service, with a total of 33 buses planned. Although plans were reaffirmed in 2017 to expand the double-decker fleet by 30, the existing three Enviro500s were quietly withdrawn from service by 2018 due to operational issues and were subsequently transferred to the Rapid KL fleet.

Beyond mass transit, double-deckers have seen widespread use as long-distance coaches since the late-2000s in response to growing demand for intercity travel, as expressways and outlying bus stops lack physical obstacles that plagued urban bus services.

Singapore
In October 1953, a single AEC Regent III double-decker from the fleet of the Kuala Lumpur-based General Transport Company was sent to Singapore for demonstration. It was used on service by the Singapore Traction Company for two weeks. After that, it was inspected by two Chinese-owned bus companies, and then sent back to Kuala Lumpur. However, no orders for double-deckers immediately followed.

Although Sentosa was already operating several ex-London double decker buses such as the AEC Regent III RT and the Leyland Titan RTL from 1975 to the early 1980s, double-decker buses only made a major comeback in Singapore's public bus system on 13 June 1977 when Singapore Bus Service (SBS, present-day SBS Transit), introduced 20 Leyland Atlantean AN68 buses on route 86 which was launched by then-Deputy Prime Minister and Minister of Communications Ong Teng Cheong that day. The success of the 1977 Leyland Atlantean buses led to SBS purchasing another 500 Leyland Atlantean AN68 buses from 1978 up to 1984 while also trialing several demonstrators such as the Volvo B55, Dennis Dominator, Scania BR112DH and Volvo B10MD Citybus concurrently. The next batch of double-deck buses was introduced from 1984 to 1986 and consists of the Mercedes-Benz O305 and the Leyland Olympian, both of which were bodied by Walter Alexander Coachbuilders with an R-type body. In 1993, the first air-conditioned  (as opposed to the average  length then) double-decker bus, the Leyland Olympian 3-axle was launched as the "Superbus". The original 200 "Superbuses" were followed by an additional 471 Volvo Olympian 3-axle "Superbuses" and 100 non air-conditioned Volvo Olympian buses from 1994 to 2000. The Volvo B10TL, the first stepless, ultra-low-floor "Superbus", was launched in 1999 while 20 low-floor Dennis Trident 3 buses followed in 2001. The first wheelchair-accessible double-decker buses, the Volvo B9TL, were introduced in 2006; by 2014, SBS Transit had over 1631 of these buses in service.

SBS Transit's monopoly on double-decker buses in Singapore ended in 2014 when rival SMRT Buses ordered 201 Alexander Dennis Enviro500 buses. It was followed up with 16 MAN ND323F A95 buses in 2015.

Some of the existing double-deckers owned by SMRT Buses and SBS Transit were transferred to new operators Tower Transit and Go-Ahead under the Bus Contracting Model. Subsequent orders of B9TL and A95 buses are being made by the Land Transport Authority, are painted in a lush green livery (rather than the operator-specific liveries of SMRT and SBS Transit), and are used by all operators. Currently, there are more than 3,000 double-decker buses in Singapore, all of which are air-conditioned and wheelchair-accessible. Newer units introduced from 2018 onwards are also Euro VI-compliant and are equipped with USB charging ports and Visual Passenger Information Displays.

In March 2017, the first three-door, two-staircase 12.8m long double-decker bus in Singapore was introduced by Tower Transit with the registration plate SG5999Z for a six-month trial period. After the trial, the bus was transferred to SBS Transit. The trial was successful and the Land Transport Authority purchased another 100 3-door double decker buses of the Alexander Dennis Enviro500 and MAN A95 builds in April 2019. In April 2018, SBS Transit introduced into service a single Volvo B8L registered as SG4003D. Fully electric Yutong E12DD double-decker buses will also be introduced by 2020.

Outside public bus operations, open-top buses are also operated by Big Bus Tours. The New Routemaster from London also visited Singapore twice; once in 2014 and another in 2016.

Philippines

Presently double-decker buses are used by the Mall of Asia Arena (Higer KLQ6119GSE3 B91H-series) and the Subic Bay Metropolitan Authority (King Long XMQ6110GS). Former operators were Manila Motor Company (Matorco), which introduced such buses to the Philippines, and the Metro Manila Transit Corporation (Leyland Atlantean). The first double-decker bus in decades to serve the riding public in the capital region debuted in January 2016, serving the SM City North EDSA-Ayala Center route. It also sports PWD and elderly sitting, a national first. Those were technically the Premium Point To Point buses

In the entirety of Visayas and Mindanao region, Pabama Transport based in Bukidnon province in northern Mindanao was the first bus line to deploy double decker buses (Zhongtong LCK6148H Navigator) which started servicing the riding public in June 2018. It was also the first in the country to field double-decker buses for provincial operations.

Thailand
Double deckers are also commonly found in Thailand nowadays. Previously there are Volvo B10M with Alexander bodies available.

Vietnam
The first two double decker buses were used for route 06 of Ho Chi Minh City since 3 December 2005 in green color, like many HCMC buses at that time. There were rumors in May 2019 that these two buses will cease their operation, but Head of HCMC Department of Transportation confirmed that the buses will remain in service.

West Asia

Iraq

First used in 1938 and continued until 2003. They became part of the Iraqi culture and resumed operating in Baghdad in 2013 with modern buses. A fare cannot reach more than 45 U.S. cents or 500 Iraqi Dinars. The double-decker buses in Baghdad were the first to enter the Middle East and the Arab world.

Iran
The first double-decker bus in iran was assembled in 1959 and one of the most popular double-decker buses in iran was Leyland Atlantean. There is lots of touris double-decker buses in famous cities in Iran like Tehran, Mashad, Kish and Tabriz and more cities.

Israel
In Israel, Egged operated double-decker buses from 1984 to 2013.

First double-decker (built by Neoplan) arrived to Israel on 26 August 1984, and during the trial period it performed 434 test drives on four different lines, passed 195583 kilometers and gathered public attention and interest. Double-deckers were found commercially attractive, and in 1988 an agreement between Egged and Neoplan was signed, ordering first 20 buses, with additional 30 buses ordered in the following year. The double-deckers started to arrive in 1989, and they worked on lines Tel-Aviv—Jerusalem, Tel-Aviv—Haifa, Tel-Aviv—Be'er Sheba and on Eilat lines.

However, both technical issues (in connection between the engine and the transmission) and religious issues (Haredi Jews had issues with women sitting above and in front of them) led to gradual decline in use of these double-deckers. They were removed from the last major line operating them, the Tel-Aviv—Jerusalem line (480), in the end of the 1990s, worked for some time on local lines in the Shfela region, and in the beginning of 2000s were finally removed from service. Some of the buses were sold to an auto dealer from Jordan, who in turn sold them to Iraq and other countries of the Persian gulf.

In August 2005, three double-deckers returned to service on line 99 "Scenic route" in Jerusalem. These 3 buses were assembled from parts of 7 double-deckers that were still in storage. The operational cost for double-deckers gradually grew beyond the limit when repairs were still attractive, which led to their final removal from service in 2013.

Kuwait
In the 1980s, KPTC took a number of Leyland Atlantean's. Since Deregulation one of the other main bus operators Kuwait Citybus re-introduced 56 double deckers built by King Long in 2017.

United Arab Emirates
170 Neoplan double deckers are in operation in Dubai.

North America

Canada

In 2000, the cities of Victoria and Kelowna, British Columbia, placed an order for 10 Dennis Trident 3 buses imported from the United Kingdom, becoming the first cities in North America to use modern double-decker buses in their public transit systems. Several more orders have been placed since then, and as of 2017 BC Transit operates 69 double-decker buses, including Trident 3s and the newer Alexander Dennis Enviro500s, of which 62 operate on the Victoria Regional Transit System and the remaining 7 with the Kelowna Regional Transit System. In Victoria, the buses are mainly used on routes that go from downtown to the suburbs, and to the Swartz Bay Ferry Terminal near Sidney, B.C. They can also be found on routes that head to the University of Victoria and the Western Communities, and have proven to be very popular amongst both locals and tourists.

TransLink, the transit authority of Metro Vancouver, British Columbia, tested 2 Enviro500 buses on lines 301, 311, 351, 354, 555, 601 and 620 between November 2017 and March 2018. It was announced soon after that 32 double-deckers will be purchased, arriving in 2019. On 30 October 2019, TransLink's first double-decker bus made its first ever run along route 620 from the Bridgeport station in Richmond to the Tsawwassen Ferry Terminal.

From March 2009 to June 2012, three imported Alexander Dennis Enviro500 double-decker buses similar to those in Victoria were used on OC Transpo express routes on the Transitway in Ottawa, Ontario. Delivered in November 2008, these buses proved to be efficient in reducing costs, but their height prohibited their use on many routes. Consequently, these three buses were withdrawn and sold to Victoria in late 2012 after a new series of 75 Enviro500 buses with a lower height that met MTO regulations entered service earlier that year. As of 2018 OC Transpo has 133 of these buses.

GO Transit, a regional transit system serving the Greater Toronto Area in Ontario is the largest user of double-decker buses in Canada, with over 150 such vehicles in service as of 2017. Its fleet comprises Alexander Dennis Enviro500s in a single-door, commuter-type configuration similar to its fleet of highway coaches.

Strathcona County Transit of Strathcona County, Alberta, started a pilot project in September 2010 which explored using different high-capacity bus types to carry more passengers on high-demand commuter routes between Strathcona County and Edmonton. This involved a one-year lease of an Alexander Dennis Enviro500 from the manufacturer. After completing a year of testing between September 2010 and October 2011, a firm order of 14 Enviro500s was placed in 2013 for their service between Sherwood Park and downtown Edmonton, with the first arriving in late August. Five more buses were ordered in 2016, bringing the fleet of double-deckers to 19 as of 2017. Strathcona County Transit currently has 24 Enviro500s in their fleet.

Mexico

The Mexico City Metrobús bus rapid transit system started operating a fleet of 90 Alexander Dennis Enviro500s on its new line 7, along the city's boulevard, Paseo de la Reforma, in February 2018.

Panama
At least one double-decker bus.

United States

With the exception of coaches, double-decker buses are uncommon in the United States. Many private operators, such as Megabus, run by Coach USA, employ double-decker buses on busier intercity routes.

For publicly run transport, articulated buses are generally preferred. Nonetheless, a handful of municipal operators use double-decker buses, primarily on the West Coast.

In Davis, California, Unitrans, the student-run bus company of University of California, Davis, operates six double-decker buses imported from London. One of these buses has been converted to run on compressed natural gas (CNG). There was also the prototype GX-1 Scenicruiser of Greyhound Lines, which enters from the first floor: the second floor contains the driver's compartment and more seats.

Citizens Area Transit, the transit authority in the Las Vegas area, introduced a fleet of double-deckers to serve the Las Vegas Strip route in October 2005. The route is branded as "The Deuce". As of 2009 it serviced eight lines.

In Snohomish County, Washington, Community Transit operates 45 Alexander Dennis Enviro500 double-decker buses, which are used on commuter routes between Snohomish County and Seattle. An initial order of 23 buses went into service in 2011, and a second order of 17 went into service in 2015. Sound Transit, another operator in the Seattle area, bought five double-decker buses through a Community Transit order and began operating their own fleet in 2015. In 2016, a joint procurement between three transit agencies in Washington state ordered additional double-decker buses from Alexander Dennis. Community Transit would order 17 buses, with an option for 40, Sound Transit would receive 32 with an option for 43, and Kitsap Transit would buy 11 of their own.
As of 1 January 2020, Community Transit owns 52 and Sound Transit owns 37. Community transit purchased 23 in 2010 (10800-10822), 22 in 2015(15800-15821), and 8 in 2019(19850-19857). Sound transit purchased 5 in 2015(91501-91505) and another 32 in 2017(91701-91732). One of the 10800s has been retired, bringing the total for Community Transit from 53 to 52.

In San Luis Obispo, California, SLO Transit tested a double-decker bus in late 2008 to see if it would alleviate the over-crowdedness of Route 4. The borrowed bus has been returned, and SLO Transit has purchased one double-decker bus of its own using a combination of Federal, State and local funding. The bus went into operation on 8 September 2010.

In Los Angeles County, California, Foothill Transit uses double-decker battery electric buses as part of its commuter service to the Los Angeles area.

Also in Los Angeles, SCRTD used Neoplan AN 122/3 Skyliners double-decker buses from the late 1970s until 1993.

New York City phased out double-decker buses in 1960. They briefly returned from 1976 to 1978, although they only ran in Manhattan. In 2008 the Metropolitan Transportation Authority (MTA) briefly ran a Van Hool double-decker buse on several express routes. However, that year's financial crisis meant the end of the trial period. In 2018, the MTA tested another double decker bus, an Alexander Dennis Enviro500 SuperLo, on the X17J express bus route between Manhattan and Staten Island. However, the MTA has no current plans to purchase double decker buses.

In San Francisco, California, the San Francisco Municipal Transportation Agency operated one Alexander Dennis double-decker bus as a demonstrator between 12 December 2007 and 8 January 2008. The bus was running on some high capacity routes as trial.

In California, AC Transit began experimental use of a double-decker bus on the commuter route between Fremont, California, and Stanford University in 2015. On 3 December 2018 the company introduced double-deckers on its FS and J routes from Berkeley to San Francisco, and later added routes L and LA serving Richmond, El Sobrante, San Pablo and Albany.

Oceania

Australia

Double-decker buses plied route services in Sydney from the 1920s until 1986. Popular makers included AEC, Albion and Leyland. Disputes over one-man operation of double-deckers led to the phasing-out of this configuration. Double-deckers were thereafter limited to charter and tourist services.

Double-decker buses were reintroduced to the Sydney area in 2012, with Busways operating regular services from Blacktown to Rouse Hill, in Sydney's north-west. These were expanded in 2013, to traverse routes from Castle Hill and the Northern Beaches to Sydney's CBD. Forest Coach Lines and Hillsbus also purchased some. The B-Line service uses an exclusive fleet of double-decker buses.

Double-decker buses were also reintroduced to Melbourne by CDC Melbourne to operate between Werribee, Wyndham Vale and Tarneit railway stations in 2015 using buses made in Melbourne.

Double deck coaches were built by Denning between 1988 and 1992 with AAT Kings, Australian Pacific Touring and Deluxe Coachlines the main customers. The concept was revived in 2011 by Denning Manufacturing. Volgren fitted double deck coach bodies to Volvo B10Ms in the 1980s for Greyhound.

New Zealand

Until 2013–14, double decker buses were used only by tour operators and for long-distance coach services operated by Intercity Coachlines and Manabus. They were not used for public transport on urban routes.

In the 1970s a number of former London double decker buses were imported for museums, such as the Museum of Transport and Technology who used AEC Regent Low Height (RLH) buses to connect museum sites and for charters. Sydney double decker and more London buses of various models (AEC Regent III RT, AEC Routemasters etc.) were imported by charter and tourist operators and slowly became more commonplace. Bridge heights and shop verandas restricted the use of double deckers around New Zealand until congestion and high public transport use required some innovative solutions.

A single double-decker bus arrived in Auckland in early March 2013 for a trial, with more planned to arrive in 2014 if the trial proved successful. The Scania K320UD bus, operated by Ritchies Transport, began revenue service on 11 March 2013 on the well-patronised Northern Express services on the Northern Busway between Albany and Britomart in downtown Auckland. In addition, NZ Bus and Howick & Eastern investigated the use of double-decker buses on the Dominion Road, Mount Eden Road, and Botany to downtown routes. By May 2016, double deckers were running on the busway and on many other Auckland urban routes, operated by several companies, with more to be introduced.

Four 87-seat DesignLine double deckers started on Waikato services in 2018. Since 15 July 2018, double deckers, including some fully electric models, have been operating in Wellington. There are currently 51 diesel double deckers running and 10 electric ones. 34 of the diesel double deckers are euro 6, while the remaining 17 are euro 5.

South America

Argentina
In Argentina, double-decker buses are the second most widely used means of transport for long-distance trips, surpassed only by aeroplanes. Double-decker buses are also used by tourists in Buenos Aires where they're used in city-tours.

Bolivia
In Bolivia, double-deck buses are a common means of transportation for long-distance trips between large cities such as department capitals. These buses also connect Bolivia with different countries. The double deck buses travel to Argentina, Brazil, Peru and Chile. The buses are equipped with toilets, and several companies offer buses with large seats called Leito (Bus Cama) that can be pulled back and be shaped into a bed.

Brazil
Double-decker buses are common in long-distance services interstate and international (as destined for Argentina and Paraguay). It is possible to see VIP double-decker buses also connecting cities in the same state, such as São Paulo City, São José do Rio Preto and Ribeirão Preto. Inside these buses there are one TV for each person and boarding service for example. Open double-decker are used for city tours (such as Rio de Janeiro and Bahia). In São Paulo, there was an experience of use for urban services in the 1980s, but without success due to issues with the height of the vehicle. These buses are fabricated in Brazil and exported to many countries.

Ecuador

Double-decker buses are used in city-tours in Quito, Cuenca and parts of the coast. They are very popular in the touristic district of the Historic District in Quito. Double-decker buses are common on long distance interurban trips.

Chile
Double-decker buses are common in long distance interurban trips. Open top double-decker are used in city-tours. On 9 March 2017, the British Embassy in Chile made a deal with the Public Transport Ministry in Santiago to try double-deckers for public transport. On that day the first bus was tested on Santiago roads. On 26 February 2019, it was announced that another type of double-decker bus will start to be used in a particular route in Central Santiago

Peru
Double-decker buses are common on long distance interurban trips to main cities of the country. Open top double-deckers are used in city tours in downtown Lima and in the tourist district of Miraflores. Pio Delgado Arguedas bought 300 Greyhound buses and was the distributor of the buses in South America and Mexico. He also created TEPSA, and was the owner for years until he sold his company.

Triple-decker buses

There have been attempts to build a triple-decker bus. However such vehicles are problematic in that the high centre of gravity leads to instability and there is the risk of hitting trees or bridges. In almost all models the third level was a small compartment in the rear part of the bus, such as a triple-decker capable of carrying eighty-eight people from Rome to Tivoli in 1932 or the General American Aerocoach 3 Decker Bus of 1952. The only three-decker with a full-length third level ever built is the Knight Bus that John Richardson created for Harry Potter and the Prisoner of Azkaban by combining two AEC Regent III RTs. Although the AEC was merely a film prop, a British built ECW bodied Bristol VR double-decker bus imitation of the Knight bus was a functioning bus, which even went on tour.

Comparison with articulated buses

Operators worldwide must often decide between articulated and double-decker buses on popular routes. Articulated buses, entirely on one level, offer more room for disabled passengers, luggage and pushchairs; they may also be needed on routes going under low bridges or weak bridges that cannot take high axle loads. Double-decker buses, however, have a smaller road footprint and as such disrupt traffic, or block turning lanes less than articulated buses.

Double-decker buses may be more popular with passengers because of the better view, and with cyclists, who may be at less risk than they are with the unpredictable swing of an articulated bus's tail. Articulated buses normally offer more standing room while double-decker buses may sometimes (not always) offer more seats. Articulated buses have less dwell time because of the extra doors, and double-decker buses offer fewer chances for fare dodgers since there are fewer or no unmanned doors.

Collisions with bridges
There have been a significant number of incidents in which a double-decker bus has collided with a low bridge, often a railway bridge. This is often caused by the driver making a wrong turn, driving a route they are unfamiliar with, or being used to driving single-decker buses and forgetting to allow for their vehicle's extra height when driving a double-decker.

A collision with a railroad bridge by a Megabus in September 2010 at Syracuse, New York, killed four passengers and injured 17.

In recent years in the United Kingdom, six people had minor injuries after their bus hit a railway bridge at Stockport in July 2013. An empty bus had its roof removed after hitting a railway bridge in Birkenhead in December 2014.

In March 2015, a bus carrying 76 children hit a bridge at Staines-upon-Thames. Eleven passengers were taken to hospital but none were seriously injured. In the same month, an empty bus had its roof removed after hitting a railway bridge in Isleworth West London. A Stagecoach Highlands bus collided with a railway bridge at Balloch, Highland, Scotland in April 2015. There were no casualties, one top-deck passenger narrowly escaped injury by throwing himself to the floor.

A bus operated by Bluestar had its roof removed after colliding with a railway bridge at Romsey in May 2015. An incident in July 2015 in Norwood, London also resulted in the removal of the bus' roof; seven people were injured. Similar incidents occurred in September 2015 in Rochdale, Greater Manchester (seventeen were injured) and in Bournemouth in April 2016, with all thirty passengers escaping without injury.

On 11 September 2020, a bus carrying 72 children hit a bridge, taking the complete roof off, in Winchester, Hampshire, on the way to school. Three children were seriously injured and required surgery whilst a further 12 suffered minor injuries. The bus was operated by Stagecoach South.

In popular culture

In the film Summer Holiday, Cliff Richard and friends drive a double-decker bus fitted out as a caravan across Europe.
In The Mummy Returns, Rick O'Connell (Brendan Fraser), Evelyn O'Connell (Rachel Weisz), Ardeth Bay (Oded Fehr), Jonathan Carnahan (John Hannah) and Alex O'Connell (Freddie Boath) are chased by mummies whilst they ride on a AEC Regent III RT in London. 
In Live and Let Die, Roger Moore as James Bond, drives one being chased. The chase involving the double-decker bus was filmed with a former London bus adapted by having the top sliced off, then put back in place running on ball bearings to allow it to slide away from the undercarriage on impact with a low bridge. The stunts involving the bus were performed by Maurice Patchett, a London Transport bus driving instructor.
A double deck bus also featured at the end of the final episode of the sitcom The Young Ones.
The British sitcom On the Buses featured double deckers, driven by Stan Butler (portrayed by Reg Varney).
In Harry Potter and the Prisoner of Azkaban, the aforementioned Knight Bus is a triple-decker bus which can fit under bridges due to magic.
During the 2012 Summer Olympics, Czech artist David Černý presented his moving sculpture named London Booster, a full-sized "London double-decker bus" (actually ex-Southern Vectis from the Isle of Wight) permanently doing push-ups with hydraulic-powered human-like arms. This was an accompanying installation outside temporarily Czech Olympic House in London borough of Islington.
The double decker bus was also a star in a Saturday morning TV series titled Here Come the Double Deckers in the 1970s.
A double decker bus was featured on the 2009 Doctor Who episode ‘Planet of the Dead’, where it transported its passengers through a wormhole to the alien planet of San Helios.
The British television series Thomas & Friends features an anthropomorphic AEC Bridgemaster named Bulgy, a character infamous for his dislike for railways. He deems roads superior to rail traffic, and often tells lies or sabotages the railways to make the roads flourish. He always gets his comeuppance in the end, though he refuses to give up his beliefs.

Types of double-decker buses (including coaches and trolleybuses)

 Adiputro Jetbus Super Double Decker
 AEC 661T
 AEC 663T
 AEC 664T
 AEC 691T
 AEC 761T
 AEC Bridgemaster
 AEC K-type
 AEC Q-type
 AEC Regent I
 AEC Regent II
 AEC Regent III
 AEC Regent III RT
 AEC Regent IV
 AEC Regent V
 AEC Routemaster
 Alexander Dennis Enviro400
 Alexander Dennis Enviro500
 Ashok Leyland Titan
 Ayats Bravo
 BCI CitiRider
 BMMO D9
 BMMO D10
 Bristol K
 Bristol Lodekka
 Bristol VR
 Beulas Jewel
 Bombardier DD
 BÜSSING D2U
 BÜSSING D3
 BÜSSING D38
 BÜSSING DE 72 LVG
 Bustech CDi
 Daimler/Leyland Fleetline
 Dennis Dragon
 Dennis Trident 2
 Dennis Trident 3
 Do 54
 Do 56
 Hyundai Elec City Double Decker
 Laksana Legacy SR eXtra Double Decker
 Leyland Atlantean
 Leyland-DAB Lion
 Leyland Olympian
 Leyland Titan
 Leyland Titan (B15)
 MAN Lion's City A95 DD 
 MAN Lion's City A39 DD
 Mávaut-Ikarus 556
 MCW Metrobus
 MCW Metroliner
 MCW/Scania Metropolitan
 Marcopolo S.A. Paradiso 1800 G7
 Mitsubishi Fuso Aero King
 Morodadi Prima patriot Three Pointed Star Double Decker
 Neoplan Jumbocruiser
 Neoplan Megaliner
 Neoplan Skyliner
 New Routemaster
 New Armada Evolander
 New Armada Highlander
 New Armada Skylander
 Nusantara Gemilang Maxi Miracle Double Decker
 Nusantara Gemilang Conqueror Double Decker
 Opel Blitz Aero Strassenzepp Doppeldecker
 Optare MetroDecker
 Rahayu Santosa Jetliner Double Decker
 Scania Citywide LFDD
 Scania OmniCity DD
 Scania OmniDekka
 Scania KUD
 Scania NUD
 Setra S 228 DT
 Setra S 328 DT
 Setra S 431 DT
 Stallion Bus Double Decker
 Thaco TB120SS
 Thaco TB138SS
 Tentrem Avante D2
 Van Hool Astromega TD8/TD9/TDX series
 VDL Citea DLF-114
 VDL Futura FDD2
 Volvo Ailsa B55
 Volvo Citybus
 Volvo B5TL
 Volvo B5LH
 Volvo B7TL
 Volvo B8L
 Volvo B8RLE
 Volvo B9TL
 Volvo Mexico
 Volvo Olympian
 Volvo Super Olympian
 Wright SRM
 Wright StreetDeck
 Yutong City Master

See also

Articulated bus
Bilevel rail car
Clerestory bus
List of buses

Footnotes

External links

Davis Wiki page on double-decker buses (Davis, California, USA)
Image of a Berlin double-decker bus
Photos of Leyland double-decker Bus
From The Upper Deck, photography project, photos taken from London Double Deckers Buses
VDL Futura FDD2 double-decker bus

 
Buses by type